Emine Nemika Sultan ("benign, trustworthy" and "graceful"; 9 March 1888 – 6 September 1969) was an Ottoman princess, the daughter of Şehzade Mehmed Selim, son of Sultan Abdul Hamid II.

Early life
Nemika Sultan was born on 9 March 1888 in the Yıldız Palace. Her father was Şehzade Mehmed Selim, and her mother was Iryale Hanım, the daughter of Hassan Ali Marshan and Fatma Horecan Aredba. Her mother was the sister of Nazikeda Kadın, first wife of Sultan Mehmed VI. She was the second child and only daughter of her parents. She had an elder brother Şehzade Mehmed who died young and a paternal younger half-brother, Şehzade Mehmed Abdülkerim. She was the granddaughter of Sultan Abdul Hamid II and Bedrifelek Kadın.

In March 1898, she attended the wedding of her aunt Naime Sultan, daughter of Abdul Hamid II and Bidar Kadın, and Mehmed Kemaleddin Pasha, son of Gazi Osman Pasha.  During the ceremonial occasion, she sat with her aunts Şadiye Sultan and Hamide Ayşe Sultan.

Nemika lost her mother in 1904 when she was sixteen years old.

Marriage
Nemika Sultan married Ali Kenan Isin Bey on 22 June 1911 in the Yıldız Palace. The couple was given Göztepe Palace as their residence. She gave birth to the couple's first child, a daughter, Fatma Fethiye Hanımsultan on 13 November 1912. Three years later, on 14 September 1915, she gave birth to her second child, a son, Sultanzade Ibrahim in the Göztepe Palace. Four years later, on 1 March 1920, she gave birth to her third child, a son, Sultanzade Kazim in the Göztepe Palace. Her husband was Turkey's first mining engineer to study abroad.

At the exile of imperial family in March 1924, Nemika and her family settled in Paris, France, where she gave birth to her fourth and last child, a daughter Emine Satia Hanımsultan on 15 January 1927. They later moved to Tripoli, Lebanon. Here her husband, Ali Kenan served as the mayor of Tripoli. She was widowed at Ali Kenan's death in 1962.

Death
In 1952, the exile for princesses was revocated and Nemika returned to Turkey after widowed, and settled in Bostancı district in Istanbul. She died on 6 September 1969 at the age of eighty-one, and was buried in the mausoleum of Şehzade Ahmed Kemaleddin, located in Yahya Efendi Cemetery, Istanbul.

Honours
 Order of the House of Osman
 Order of the Medjidie, Jeweled
 Order of Charity, 1st Class

Issue

Ancestry

References

Sources
 

1888 births
1969 deaths
Royalty from Istanbul
19th-century Ottoman princesses
20th-century Ottoman princesses